Yannis Morin (born August 31, 1993) is a French professional basketball player for Chorale Roanne Basket of the LNB Pro A.

Professional career 
Born in Fort-de-France, capital of the French overseas department of Martinique, Morin went through the youth ranks of Golden Lion Basketball in Saint-Joseph, Martinique, before joining the Pôle Espoirs de Martinique. He enrolled at INSEP, National Institute of Sport, expertise, and performance, in 2008. In 2012, he joined LNB Pro A side Cholet Basket. His best season statistically at Cholet was 2014–15, when he averaged 3.6 points and 1.9 rebounds in 31 games played.

In 2015–16, Morin scored 7.5 points a game for French second-division team Denain, before heading to fellow ProB side STB Le Havre for the 2016–17 season. Making 34 appearances for Le Havre that year, he averaged 6.8 points as well as 7.4 rebounds per outing. In 2017, he participated in the NBA Summer League with the Oklahoma City Thunder.

On October 11, 2017, Morin signed a training camp contract with the Oklahoma City Thunder. He was waived on October 14 as one of the team's final preseason roster cuts and then joined the Oklahoma City Blue of the NBA G League averaging 5.6 points and 4.2 rebounds in 34 games. On April 14, 2018, after the conclusion of the G League season, he signed with Le Mans Sarthe of the French LNB Pro A. He saw action in 12 games of the ProA playoffs, averaging 2.7 points and 1.8 boards a contest, en route to winning the French championship.

After a short stint with Nanterre 92, he signed a short-term deal with fellow Pro A team Champagne Châlons-Reims Basket in October 2018, In May 2020, he signed with SIG Strasbourg. alongside Léopold Cavalière.

In May 2022, Morin inked a deal with Chorale Roanne Basket.

International career
Morin represented the French national team at the 2009 FIBA Europe Under-16 Championship and the 2010 FIBA Europe Under-18 Championship.

References

External links 
 Yannis Morin at lnb.fr

1993 births
Living people
Centers (basketball)
Champagne Châlons-Reims Basket players
Cholet Basket players
Chorale Roanne Basket players
Denain Voltaire Basket players
French expatriate basketball people in the United States
French men's basketball players
Le Mans Sarthe Basket players
Martiniquais men's basketball players
Nanterre 92 players
Oklahoma City Blue players
Power forwards (basketball)
SIG Basket players
Sportspeople from Fort-de-France
STB Le Havre players